Cucurbita radicans, commonly known in Mexico as calabacilla (little pumpkin/gourd) or calabaza de coyote (coyote gourd),  is a species of gourd found growing wild, but also cultivated, in southern Mexico (specifically in the Federal Districts of Jalisco, Mexico and Michoacán). The type specimen was collected growing in rocks below a mountain near Guadalupe in the vicinity of Mexico City (the exact location is unclear); other specimens were also ubiquitous in the area; in corn fields and gardens, either being cultivated, or as invaders. It is a close relative of Cucurbita pedatifolia.

References

External links
 Cucurbita radicans inflorescence from the Institute of Biology at the National Autonomous University of Mexico

Flora of Mexico
Plants described in 1866
Squashes and pumpkins
radicans